The Western Systems Power Pool (WSPP) was formed in 1987 as an experiment and in 1991 became a more permanent entity for the purpose of sharing electric power between multiple power companies in the Western United States, and British Columbia.

See also
 Federal Energy Regulatory Commission

References

External links
 

1987 establishments in British Columbia
1987 establishments in the United States
Electric power infrastructure in the United States
Electric power infrastructure in Canada
Western Interconnection